Sedran may refer to:
Barney Sedran (1891-1964), American Hall of Fame basketball player
Sedran, Iran, a village in Kerman Province, Iran